Wang Chengkuai (Chinese: 王成快; pinyin: Wáng Chéngkuài; born 23 January 1995) is a Chinese professional footballer who plays as a midfielder for Chinese Super League club Shenzhen.

Club career

Early career
Wang previously played for two regional football academies before joining the youth ranks of Chinese club Dalian Shide in 2010 after he received his first international call up for the Chinese national under-14 team in 2009. In his last year with the club, he was listed as a reserve and was given the number 52 shirt. However, Dalian Shide folded by the end of the 2012 season and Wang's contract with the club was terminated.

Ajax
On 17 December 2012, Wang flew to Amsterdam for a trial with Dutch club Ajax. Along with Wei Shihao, another Chinese footballer from the ranks of Shandong Luneng Taishan, the two were recommended by former Ajax coach and talent scout Henk ten Cate who was working for Shandong Luneng Taishan at the time. While Wei was unable to make his flight due to complications with his passport, Wang had a successful trial and committed to a two-year deal on 1 September 2013, becoming the first Chinese footballer to sign with Ajax. On 11 November 2013, he made his professional debut starting for the reserves team Jong Ajax in a 1–2 loss to De Graafschap in the Eerste Divisie, before being substituted off for Branco van den Boomen in the 63rd minute.

Portugal
On 19 August 2014, Wang signed for Portuguese club Coimbrões. He made seven league appearances for the club, as well as one appearance in the Taça de Portugal during his first season in Portugal.

On 15 July 2015 it was announced that Wang had transferred to Gondomar S.C., remaining in the Portuguese Second Division. He made his debut for his new team on 23 August 2015, coming on as a substitute for Belinha in the 86th minute of the 3–0 win at home against SC Vila Real.

Shenzhen 
On 9 July 2016, Wang transferred to China League One side Shenzhen F.C. He would make his debut in a league game on 14 August 2016 against Tianjin Quanjian in a 5-2 defeat. He would be a squad player as the club gained promotion to the top tier at the end of the 2018 China League One campaign.

Zibo Cuju 
In 2021, Wang joined China League One side Zibo Cuju on loan.

International career
Wang was called up for the China under-14 squad to participate in the 2009 Asian Youth Games in Singapore. He made his debut on 20 June 2009 in the opening Group B match of the Preliminary round against Myanmar, and scored in the 2nd and 12th minutes of the game, helping his side to a 7–3 victory. He played in the remaining fixtures of the tournament, losing 2–0 to Iran in their final match to place fourth at the tournament. That same year he also competed for his regional team, Liaoning in the 2009 National Games of China, finishing in third place of the under-16 competition.

Career statistics 
.

Notes

References

External links 
 

1995 births
Living people
Chinese footballers
Sportspeople from Wenzhou
Footballers from Zhejiang
Dalian Shide F.C. players
Association football midfielders
AFC Ajax players
Jong Ajax players
Gondomar S.C. players
Shenzhen F.C. players
Zibo Cuju F.C. players
Cangzhou Mighty Lions F.C. players
Eerste Divisie players
Segunda Divisão players
China League Two players
China League One players
Chinese Super League players
Chinese expatriate footballers
Expatriate footballers in the Netherlands
Expatriate footballers in Portugal
Chinese expatriate sportspeople in the Netherlands
Chinese expatriate sportspeople in Portugal